Quasar is an astronomical body producing vast amounts of energy.

Quasar may also refer to:

Companies
 Quasar (brand), a brand of electronics
 Quasar (Czech company), a hang glider manufacturer
 Quassar, a defunct Mexican airline

Entertainment
 Quasar (album), a 1985 album by Jimmy Giuffre
 Quazar (album), the debut album by the band Quazar
 Quasar (band), British neo-prog and progressive rock band formed in 1979
 "Quasar" (song), a 2012 song by The Smashing Pumpkins
 Quasar (character), several Marvel comic book characters
 Quasar (Wendell Vaughn), a fictional superhero in Marvel Comics
 Quasar (laser tag), a laser tag system in the UK and Ireland, also known as Q-Zar
 Quazar (board game), a 1977 board wargame
 Quasar (arcade game), a 1980 arcade game by Zaccaria
 Quasar (video game), a 1983 snake game for the Apple II computer

People
Quasar Thakore-Padamsee (born 1978), Indian stage actor turned theatre director & producer.

Other 

 Quasar (motorcycle), a feet forward motorcycle with a hard top
 Quasar (satellite), a military satellite
 Quasimidi Quasar, a sound synthesizer
 Quazar, former ring name of professional wrestler César Curiel
Peugeot Quasar, a 1984 concept car

See also
 Aeroalcool Quasar, a Brazilian light aircraft
 Quasi-star, a type of star with a black-hole core
 Quaoar, a possible dwarf planet in the outer Solar System
 Pulsar (disambiguation)